Corinna Kuhnle (born 4 July 1987 in Vienna) is an Austrian slalom canoeist who has competed at the international level since 2002.

She won five medals at the ICF Canoe Slalom World Championships with two golds (K1: 2010, 2011), two silvers (K1 team: 2014, 2017) and a bronze (K1 team: 2005). She also won two golds, six silvers and three bronzes at the European Championships. Kuhnle won the overall world cup title in the K1 category in 2014 and 2015.

She finished 8th in the K1 event at the 2012 Summer Olympics in London. Four years later in Rio de Janeiro she finished in 5th place in the same event.

World Cup individual podiums

1 Pan American Championship counting for World Cup points
2 Oceania Canoe Slalom Open counting for World Cup points

References

  – accessed 11 September 2010.

External links

 
 

Austrian female canoeists
Living people
1987 births
Canoeists at the 2012 Summer Olympics
Canoeists at the 2016 Summer Olympics
Olympic canoeists of Austria
Sportspeople from Vienna
Medalists at the ICF Canoe Slalom World Championships